is a single-member constituency of the House of Representatives in the Diet of Japan. It is located in Southern Gunma and consists of the city of Fujioka, the Southern part of Takasaki city (without the former municipalities of Gunma, Misato, Haruna and Kurabuchi) as well as Kanna town and Ueno village in Tano county. As of 2009, 292,356 eligible voters were registered in the district.

Before the electoral reform that took effect in 1996, the area was part of the multi-member Gunma 3rd district that elected four Representatives by single non-transferable vote.

Gunma is a "conservative kingdom" (hoshu ōkoku), a stronghold of the Liberal Democratic Party, and the pre-1996 multi-seat 3rd district had been home to the families of LDP presidents and Prime Ministers of Japan Yasuhiro Nakasone, Takeo Fukuda and Keizō Obuchi. The new 4th district's first representative was Fukuda's son Yasuo Fukuda (Machimura faction) who was elected LDP president and Prime Minister himself in 2007 over Tarō Asō (Asō faction). In the LDP's landslide defeat in 2009, Fukuda held his seat over Yukiko Miyake, one of the "Ozawa girls", a group of first-time female candidates handpicked by former Democratic Party president Ichirō Ozawa. Miyake easily won a seat in the Northern Kantō proportional representation block. She followed Ozawa out of the party in 2012 and ran for his Tomorrow Party of Japan in Democratic Party president Yoshihiko Noda's Chiba 4th district where she failed to win even a tenth of the vote, disqualifying her also for potential re-election in the proportional representation bloc.

In Gunma 4th district, Yasuo Fukuda retired in 2012 and was safely succeeded by his son Tatsuo.

List of representatives

Election results

References 

Gunma Prefecture
Districts of the House of Representatives (Japan)